Douglas W. Stoddart (born March 5, 1952 in Cincinnati, Ohio) is a private attorney licensed in the Commonwealth of Massachusetts.

A native of Wellesley, Massachusetts, Stoddart graduated from Colgate University in 1974, where he played on the Red Raiders men's soccer team, and Syracuse University College of Law in 1977. From 1978 to 1986 he worked for the Monroe County, New York District Attorney's Office. In 1986, Stoddart returned to Massachusetts to work as a private practice attorney in Natick.

From 1991 to 1999, Stoddart represented the 5th Middlesex District in the Massachusetts House of Representatives. He resigned his seat after he was appointed as a judge in Middlesex District Court.

References

1952 births
Massachusetts state court judges
Republican Party members of the Massachusetts House of Representatives
Colgate University alumni
Syracuse University College of Law alumni
People from Wellesley, Massachusetts
People from Natick, Massachusetts
Living people